Essays in French Literature and Culture is an annual peer-reviewed academic journal published by the University of Western Australia. It was established in 1964 by James R. Lawler, the Foundation Chair of French Studies at this university. The journal focuses on French Studies, in a broad sense. From its inception, the journal's main aim has been "to draw attention to broader aspects of French literary culture". From 2022, the journal will be available both in print and in soft copies, as well as Open Access for free (after a 3 months grace period). and indexed in the Directory of Open Access Journals.

History
The journal was established in 1964 by James R. Lawler.
In 1975, the journal's editorship passed on to Denis Boak who, in a commemorative issue celebrating the journal's fiftieth anniversary, argues that Essays in French Literature was a "free-standing intellectual endeavour" providing "an extra outlet for young scholars to publish". He was succeeded by Andrew Hunwick in 1995. Hélène Jaccomard took over in 2007.A growing interest in cultural studies in the field of French studies led to a widening of the scope of the journal and its renaming in 2008. The new title reflects this wider emphasis on culture.
In the context of the crisis in academic publishing, and as one of only two French Studies academic journals in Australia, Essays in French Literature and Culture has shown a remarkable ability to survive thanks to the quality of the articles it stringently selects, and its widening readership which is its only financial means of support.
The journal's importance is acknowledged by the Australian Society of French Studies and Informit database.

Editorial board
 Prof. Hélène Jaccomard, managing editor, The University of Western Australia
 Associate Professor Bonnie Thomas, associate editor, The University of Western Australia
 Prof. Véronique Duché, University of Melbourne
 Dr Paul Gibbard, The University of Western Australia
 Dr Rosemary Lancaster, The University of Western Australia
 Prof. Louise Hardwick, University of Birmingham
 Prof. Srilata Ravi, University of Alberta
 Dr Jean-Marie Volet, The University of Western Australia.

Past issues
In the first forty years of its existence, the journal published essays spontaneously submitted to the Editors. Since 2007 many issues have been thematic and guest edited by experts in the field. All the contributions go through a thorough double-blind evaluation by independent assessors.
Themes recently covered by the journal:

- issue nr 45: Foreign? Writing in French (2008)
- issue nr 46 : Sports (2009)
- issue nr 47 and 48: Landscape and Memory (2010 and 2011)
- issue nr 49: The Paratext (2012)
- issue nr 50: Playtime (2013)
- issue nr 51: Représenter la Grande Guerre: les écrivains et les artistes face à l’épreuve (1914-1920) (2014)
- issue nr 52: Diaspora, Afropolitanism and Congolese Literature (2015)
- issue nr 53: Conflict, dialogue and representation (2016)
- issue nr 54: Hidden Words, Hidden Worlds (France 1939–1945) (2017)
- issue nr 55 : Miscellaneous (2018).
- issue nr 56 : “Mines de rien”. L’Antillaise et l’Afropéenne face aux tropologies, entre mythes et réalités au fil du temps (2019)
- issue nr 57 : Identité et Environnement
- issue nr 58 : The Critical French Medical Humanities

Current issue nr 59 (2022) 
Theme: 'Retranslation revisited/La Retraduction revisitée', Edited by Hélène Jaccomard, University of Western Australia

Aurore Dericq Facchinetti, Étude croisée de deux versions françaises de Suétone en 1770 
Sanja Perovic and Brecht Deseure, Radical Retranslations of the Revolutionary Era: Britain, France, Italy (1789-1815)
Lisa Kemper, Analyser les Henriades allemandes à l’aide de Berman 
Capucine Echiffre, Trois traductions françaises d’un poème de Langston Hughes (1947-1963)Hélène Jaccomard, Traduire/retraduire le vernaculaire et l’érotisme de Lady Chatterley’s LoverJeff Barda, Against Translation? Displacement, Procedures and Use in Contemporary French Poetic Practice 
Daniel Nabil Maroun, Subjectivity and Seropositivity: Retranslating Guillaume Dustan 
Marie-Laure Vuaille-Barcan et Jean Anderson, Pourquoi une seconde traduction de Pōtiki de Patricia Grace?''

Next Issues 
 Issue 60 (2023) Matter of taste (closed)
 Issue 61 (2024) Festshrift in Honour of Professor Beverley Noakes (open)

Abstracting and indexing
The journal is abstracted and indexed in the Emerging Sources Citation Index, and EBSCO and ProQuest databases.

References

External links
 and where the journal can be purchased 

Cultural journals
Literary magazines published in Australia
University of Western Australia